is a Japanese film and television director who has mostly worked at NHK. His film Nichiyobi wa Owaranai was screened in the Un Certain Regard section at the 2000 Cannes Film Festival.

Selected filmography
 Mizu no Naka no Hachigatsu (1997)
 Nichiyobi wa Owaranai (1999)

References

External links

1963 births
Living people
Japanese film directors
Japanese television directors